Baillonville is a village of Wallonia and a district of the municipality of Somme-Leuze, located in the province of Namur, Belgium.

From the early Middle Ages until 1706, the village belonged to the Prince-Bishopric of Liège. The ownership then passed between several aristocratic families until the French Revolution. The village contains the Château de Baillonville, built in 1806 in a Neoclassical style. The village church, dedicated to Saint Hubert, has Romanesque foundations. There is also a chapel from 1895 with a memorial plaque honouring American troops who fought here during the Battle of the Bulge in 1944.

References

External links

Former municipalities of Namur (province)